The Zec York River is a "zone d'exploitation controlée" (controlled harvesting zone) (zec) located in the unorganized territory Rivière-Saint-Jean, in La Côte-de-Gaspé Regional County Municipality (RCM), in the administrative region Gaspésie-Îles-de-la-Madeleine, in Quebec, in Canada. The ZEC specializes in salmon fishing.

Geography 

"Zec de la Rivière-York" is a salmon zec, located in the heart of the Gaspésie Peninsula, in the wild and in uninhabited region.

Like most major rivers of the Gaspésie Peninsula, the York River rises in the mountains around Murdochville, in the heart of Chic-Choc Mountains, in the center of the Gaspésie Peninsula. The panorama of mountains attract visitors. The York River is a typical salmon rivers of Gaspésie, with water tinted green because of the minerals in suspension, the constant level of the river and a rapid current.

From Murdochville, the York River flows at first south-east before turning north to make a big loop in the Collines-du-Basque. Then the river goes more or less in parallel (on north side) to the St. John River. Going down the river passes on the edge of zec York-Baillargeon, located around Lake Baillargeon. Then the river empties into the large bay at York Gaspé. In short, the zec York has the form of a long narrow strip that covers almost the entire length of the York River between Murdochville and Gaspé.

Salmon fishing 

Zec de la Rivière-York attracts "saumeniers" throughout America especially because of its mountain scenery and the size of salmon caught in it cold and clear waters. The York River, which is popular with salmon anglers, is segmented into eleven fishing quotas are seven. Typically, salmon pools are easily accessible along its entire length by the Highway 198. The York River has 6 species of fish, including the salmon, the brook trout, the American eel, the stickleback on banded killifish and smelt arc-en-ciel.

History 

The York River is famous for migration of heavy weight salmon.

At that time, the exclusive fishing rights belong to the purveyor Thomas Reynolds from Ottawa.

1970: The water rights of the York River pass into the hands of the York River Fishing Club. In 1977, a section of about 16 km is open to the public under the Government of Quebec.

1980: Government of Quebec opens the fishing public for the entire route of the York River. Zec de la rivièreYork is then established.

1981 Agreements are concluded with various landowners for zec extends over almost the entire territory.

Toponymy

The toponym Zec de la Rivière-York was officialized on September 5, 1985 at the Bank of Place names of Commission de toponymie du Québec (Geographical Names Board of Quebec).

See also

Notes et references

Articles connexes 
 Gaspé, a city
 Gaspésie
 La Côte-de-Gaspé Regional County Municipality (MRC)
 Rivière-Saint-Jean (La Côte-de-Gaspé), unorganized territory
 Zone d'exploitation contrôlée (controlled harvesting zone) (ZEC)

Protected areas of Gaspésie–Îles-de-la-Madeleine
Protected areas established in 1980